Alonso Álvarez de Toledo y Cabeza de Vaca, 11th Marquess of Valdueza (1 October 1903 – 28 August 1987) was a Spanish peer and dog breeder. Known to have created his own breed of scent hounds which carry his name, "perro montero Valdueza", he was a recognised hunter and one of the founding fathers of the Junta de Homologación as well as a board member of the International Council for Game and Wildlife Conservation and member of the Shikar Club.

Early life 
He was born in Madrid to Alonso Álvarez de Toledo y Samaniego, 10th Marquess of Valdueza, and María de La Paz Cabeza de Vaca y Fernández de Córdoba, daughter of the 8th Marquess of Portago.

Álvarez de Toledo inherited the Marquessate of Valdueza and the Viscountcy of la Armería in 1951. He succeeded his father as Marquess of Valdueza and his brother Mariano as Viscount of la Armería when the latter died prematurely.

He died in Ávila the 28 August 1987.

Issue 

He married María del Pilar de Urquijo y Landecho, daughter of the 1st Marquess of Bolarque, the 10th October 1930 at San Fermín de los Navarros in Madrid. She was the sister of Luis de Urquijo, president of Real Madrid and Alfonso de Urquijo, also a notable hunter. They had five children:

María Álvarez de Toledo y Urquijo (1931-2019)
Sonsoles Álvarez de Toledo y Urquijo (b. 1932)
Isabel Álvarez de Toledo y Urquijo (b. 1935)
Alonso Álvarez de Toledo y Urquijo, 12th Marquess of Villanueva de Valdueza (b. 1939)
María Teresa Álvarez de Toledo y Urquijo

Titles 
 11th Marquess of Valdueza
 12th Viscount of la Armería

References

Bibliography
 

|-

1903 births
1987 deaths
People from Madrid
Viscounts of Spain
Marquesses of Spain
Grandees of Spain
20th-century Spanish nobility